Sébastien Dewaest (born 27 May 1991) is a Belgian professional footballer who plays as centre-back for AEL Limassol. He has formerly played for Roeselare from 2011 until 2013 and for Charleroi from 2013 until 2015.

Club career
Dewaest comes from youth academy of Lille. In January 2011 he signed a professional contract with Roeselare. In his debut season he came in five games. In his second season, he played 22 league games in which he scored a goal. During 2012–13 season he scored four goals in 31 matches. In April 2013 Charleroi signed Dewaest. He signed a two-year contract with an option in two additional years.

Career statistics

Honours
Genk
 Belgian First Division A: 2018–19
 Belgian Super Cup: 2019

References

External links
 
 
 

1991 births
Living people
Association football central defenders
Belgian footballers
Belgium youth international footballers
Ligue 2 players
Championnat National 2 players
Belgian Pro League players
Challenger Pro League players
Lille OSC players
K.S.V. Roeselare players
R. Charleroi S.C. players
K.R.C. Genk players
Toulouse FC players
Oud-Heverlee Leuven players
Jong Genk players
Belgian expatriate footballers
Belgian expatriate sportspeople in France
Expatriate footballers in France
People from Poperinge
Footballers from West Flanders